The Persian Empire's province of Sistan in the 7th century  extended from the modern Iranian province of Sistan to central Afghanistan and Baluchistan province of Pakistan. 

Sistan was raided by Muslim forces from Kirman, during the reign of Caliph Umar: in 643-644 CE, Asim ibn Amr and Abdullah ibn Umar made inroads into Sistan and besieged its capital Zaranj. A treaty was concluded, forcing the Sistanis to pay the Kharaj. From that point, there were many conflicts with the Turks, who resided in the area from Kandahar to Kabul.

Like other provinces of the Persian Empire, Sistan broke into revolt during Uthman's reign in 649 CE. Uthman directed the governor of Busra, Abdullah ibn Aamir to re-conquer the province. A column was sent to Sistan under the command of Rabeah ibn Ziyad. He re-conquered it up to what is now Zaranj in Afghanistan. Rabeah ibn Ziyad was made governor of Sistan. He remained there for years, then he left for Busra, and the province again broke into revolt in a larger area.

Abdullah ibn Aamir sent Abdulrehman ibn Sumra to undertake the operation. Abdur Rahman ibn Sumra led the Muslim forces to Sistan and after crossing the frontier and overcoming resistance in the border towns advanced to Zaranj, which at the time was named Zahidan. Once Zaranj was captured Abdulrehman marched into Afghanistan and conquered it into north up to Kabul after proceeding to Hindu Kush mountain range, Zamindawar and the mountain of Ghor, which at the time was named Mandesh. during this campaign he destroyed some golden Idols and successfully captured the local Kushan Sahi king. He returned to Zaranj and remained governor until Uthman's death in 656.

See also
Islamization of Iran
History of Arabs in Afghanistan
History of Iran
Military history of Iran

Notes

7th century in Asia
Sistan
History of Sistan